This list is about IF Elfsborg players with at least 100 league appearances. For a list of all IF Elfsborg players with a Wikipedia article, see :Category:IF Elfsborg players. For the current IF Elfsborg first-team squad, see First-team squad.

This is a list of IF Elfsborg players with at least 100 league appearances.

Players
Matches of current players as of 27 March 2014.

References

 
Players
IF Elfsborg
Association football player non-biographical articles